3988 may refer to:
3988 Huma, an asteroid discovered in 1980
3988, a year in the 4th millennium
3988 BC, a year in the 40th century BC
Bank of China (SEHK: 3988)